Masters of Scale is a business and finance podcast hosted by Reid Hoffman, the co-founder of LinkedIn. The show is produced and owned by WaitWhat. In each episode, Hoffman introduces a theory on how successful businesses scale, and tests its validity by interviewing founders about their path to scale. Guests have included Facebook founder & CEO Mark Zuckerberg, Starbucks founder and former CEO Howard Schultz, Netflix founder and CEO Reed Hastings, FCA and Exor Chairman John Elkann and others. Episodes also feature brief "cameo" appearances from other founders and experts in different industries who build on Hoffman's theories.

Masters of Scale was the first American media program to commit to a 50/50 gender balance for guests. Hoffman told Quartz: "Silicon Valley prides itself on being a meritocracy, but the data shows it's not. [Masters of Scale] launched with and maintained our commitment to a 50/50 gender balance of guests on each season. It's important to not just talk about this topic, but to take action ... set an example."

History 
Executive producers Deron Triff and June Cohen approached Hoffman with the idea for the podcast, pitching it as a way of "sharing his ideas on scale in a way that could, well, scale." The first episode of Masters of Scale, featuring Airbnb CEO and cofounder Brian Chesky, aired on May 3, 2017. In March 2018, the show completed its second season. In July 2018, the show launched its third season. In April 2020, a spinoff series Masters of Scale: Rapid Response was launched to cover the impact of the COVID-19 pandemic on the business community.

Credits 
According to the show credits, the show's executive producers are June Cohen and Deron Triff. The supervising producer is Jai Punjabi. The producers are Chris McLeod, Adam Skuse, Dan Kedmey, Jordan McLeod and Ben Manila. The show is produced with support from Jennie Cataldo. Original music and sound design are by Ryan Holladay.

Episodes

Format 
Each episode of Masters of Scale is based around one of host Reid Hoffman's theories on how companies scale, which he sets out to prove, using the guest's life and experience, as well as other additional guests. Each episode is scored with an original soundtrack.

Guests 
A typical episode of Masters of Scale features one primary guest, whose story is told in detail, and who helps explain the theory, and several cameo appearances by other guests. These guests have been drawn from a wide spectrum of backgrounds, and have included Nobel Prize-winning economist Daniel Kahneman, Hall of Fame sportscaster Dick Stockton, National Geographic explorer Andrés Ruzo and Olympic runner Natasha Hastings.

Awards 
In April 2018, Masters of Scale won the Webby People's Voice Award for Best Business Podcast. In 2020, Masters of Scale was short-listed for the Webby for both Best Business Podcast and Best Live Podcast Recording.

References

External links 
 

Business and finance podcasts
2017 podcast debuts
Audio podcasts
Interview podcasts